The 1981 All-Ireland Under-21 Football Championship was the 18th staging of the All-Ireland Under-21 Football Championship since its establishment by the Gaelic Athletic Association in 1964.

Cork entered the championship as defending champions.

On 8 November 1981, Cork won the championship following a 2-9 to 1-6 defeat of Galway in a replay of the All-Ireland final. This was their fourth All-Ireland title overall and their second in successive seasons.

Results

All-Ireland Under-21 Football Championship

Semi-finals

Finals

Statistics

Miscellaneous
 Monaghan win the Ulster title for the first time in their history.
 The All-Ireland semi-finals see two first time championship pairings as Cork play Monaghan for the very first time and Louth play Galway for the very first and only time in the history of the championship.

References

1981
All-Ireland Under-21 Football Championship